Aleksandr Sergeyevich Sergeyev (born 29 May 1998) is a Russian football player.

Club career
He made his debut in the Russian Professional Football League for FC Krasnodar-2 on 29 July 2016 in a game against FC Sochi.

He made his Russian Football National League debut for FC Nizhny Novgorod on 7 July 2019 in a game against FC Tom Tomsk.

References

External links
 
 

1998 births
Sportspeople from Ulyanovsk
Living people
Russian footballers
Association football midfielders
FC Nizhny Novgorod (2015) players
FC Akron Tolyatti players
FC Krasnodar-2 players
FC Volga Ulyanovsk players
FC Mashuk-KMV Pyatigorsk players
Russian First League players
Russian Second League players